The Electric Ireland All-Ireland Minor Football Championship is the premier under-17 "knockout" competition in Gaelic football played in Ireland. 2017 was the final year of the minor under 18 football championship as it were replaced by an under 17 championship following a vote at the GAA congress on 26 February 2016.

The series of games are organised by the Gaelic Athletic Association and are played during the summer months with the All-Ireland Minor Football Final being played on the third Sunday in September in Croke Park, Dublin as the curtain-raiser to the senior final.

The winners received the Tom Markham Cup, which is named in honour of former Clare figure Tom Markham.

Overview
The All-Ireland Minor Football Championship features players at under seventeen level (players must be under 17 on 1 January of the year of the competition.  The first minor championship was played in 1929 when Clare were crowned the champions.  The championship has been held every year since then except for a period during 'The Emergency'.

Kerry are the most successful team in minor football with 16 titles in total, closely followed on the winners list by Dublin on 11 and Cork on 11. Kerry also won an unequalled five-in-a-row from 2014 to 2018.  Three teams have achieved three-in-a-rows – Kerry from 1931 to 1933; Cork from 1967 to 1969; and Dublin from 1954 to 1956.  The coveted treble of winning senior, under-21 and minor titles in the same year has been achieved on just one occasion, by Kerry in 1975.

Because teams will only play together for at most, about two or three years, unlike the senior competition, it is unusual that one county will dominate for periods any longer than this.

The current champions are Derry who defeated Kerry on 18 July 2021 to win 2020 All Ireland Minor Championship. The championship was deferred due to Covid19 in 2020.

Wins listed by county

Wins listed by province

The following counties have never won an All Ireland minor football title:

Finals listed by year

 1934 Semi-finalists Dublin and Tyrone were disqualified – Tipperary were awarded the title

References

Sources
 Roll of Honour on www.gaainfo.com
 Complete Roll of Honour on Kilkenny GAA bible

 
Minor